The 1898 VMI Keydets football team represented the Virginia Military Institute (VMI) in their eighth season of organized football. Under first-year head coach Sam Boyle.

Schedule

References

VMI
VMI Keydets football seasons
VMI Keydets football